Klyushnikov is a Russian masculine surname, its feminine counterpart is Klyushnikova. It may refer to
Andrei Klyushnikov (1892–1924), Soviet communist
Viktor Klyushnikov (1841–1892), Russian writer, editor and journalist

Russian-language surnames